Herefordshire Housing was a social housing trust responsible for the former council housing of the Herefordshire Council local authority.  The organisation was based in 3 locations in Hereford City.

History
The organisation took control of the running of the Herefordshire Council's social housing on 26 November 2002 with a Large Scale Voluntary Transfer (LSVT).

On 01/04/20 Connexus took over from Herefordshire Housing

Responsibilities
Herefordshire Housing had responsibility for over 5,000 properties in the county of Herefordshire. It provided maintenance, care advice and monitoring, sheltered housing, and other services.

References

External links
Herefordshire Housing Website
Connexus Website

Organisations based in Herefordshire
Housing associations based in England